VCA may refer to:

 Vehicle Certification Agency
 Van Cleef & Arpels
 Video Content Analysis
 Voltage-controlled amplifier also called variable-gain amplifier
 Victoria College of Art, a Canadian art school
 Victorian College of the Arts, an Australian educational institution
 Victorian College of the Arts Student Union, the student union of the Victorian College of the Arts
 Vidarbha Cricket Association Ground, a stadium in India
 Vidarbha Cricket Association Stadium, a stadium in India
 V Corps Artillery, a unit in the United States Army
 VCA Animal Hospitals, a veterinary clinic chain in the United States
 VCA Pictures, an American pornographic movie studio
 Veteran Corps of Artillery of the State of New York, An Historic Military Command in New York State
 Can Tho International Airport IATA code
Viral capsid antigen

See also
 Victorian College of the Arts Secondary School, Melbourne, Australia